Fyfe is a given name and a surname. 

Notable people with the name include:

People with the given name
Fyfe Dangerfield, (born 1980), English musician 
Fyfe Ewing, (born 1970), Northern Irish drummer 
Fyfe Robertson (1902–1987), Scottish television journalist

People with the surname
 David Maxwell Fyfe, 1st Earl of Kilmuir (1900–1967)
 Iain Fyfe (born 1982), Australian footballer
 Iona Fyfe (born 1998), Scottish singer
 James Fyfe (1942–2005), American criminologist
 Lee Fyfe (1879–1942), baseball umpire
 Liz Fyfe (born 1987), Canadian curler
 Maria Fyfe (1938–2020), Scottish politician 
 Nat Fyfe (born 1991), Australian rules footballer
 Robert Fyfe (1930–2021), Scottish actor
 Theodore Fyfe (1875–1945), Scottish architect
 Tom Fyfe (1870–1947), New Zealand mountaineer 
 William Fyfe (1927–2013), New Zealand geologist
 William Patrick Fyfe (born 1955), Canadian serial killer 
 William Hamilton Fyfe (1878–1965), English and Canadian classics scholar
 William Baxter Collier Fyfe (1836–1882), Scottish painter

Other uses
 Paul Dixon (musician), who uses the stage name fyfe

See also
 Fife (disambiguation)
 Fyffe (disambiguation)